The 2013–14 Columbus Blue Jackets season was the 14th season for the National Hockey League franchise that was established on June 25, 1997. Before the season, the team was moved into the Eastern Conference as a member of the Metropolitan Division. As a result of their move to the Metropolitan Division, the Blue Jackets became the fourth "Big 4" sports league team from Ohio to share a division with a team from Pittsburgh. The others are the Cincinnati Bengals and Cleveland Browns of the National Football League and the Cincinnati Reds of Major League Baseball - Ohio teams and Pittsburgh teams have generally been rivals over the years. The Blue Jackets also qualified for the playoffs, making it for the second time in their franchise's history.

Standings

Schedule and results

Pre-season

Regular season

Playoffs

The Columbus Blue Jackets entered the playoffs as the Eastern Conference's first wild card. They faced the Pittsburgh Penguins in the first round. This marked the second time the Blue Jackets qualified for the playoffs, and given that they were swept out of the playoffs by the Detroit Red Wings in 2009, their victory in game 2 was the franchise's first playoff win.

Player stats 
Final stats
Skaters

Goaltenders

†Denotes player spent time with another team before joining the Blue Jackets.  Stats reflect time with the Blue Jackets only.
‡Denotes player was traded mid-season.  Stats reflect time with the Blue Jackets only.
Bold/italics denotes franchise record.

Transactions 
The Blue Jackets have been involved in the following transactions during the 2013–14 season.

Trades

Free agents acquired

Free agents lost

Claimed via waivers

Lost via waivers

Lost via retirement

Player signings

Draft picks

Columbus Blue Jackets' picks at the 2013 NHL Entry Draft, which was held in Newark, New Jersey on June 30, 2013.

Draft notes

 The New York Rangers' first-round pick went to the Columbus Blue Jackets as a result of a July 23, 2012, trade that sent Rick Nash, Steven Delisle and a 2013 conditional third-round pick to the Rangers in exchange for Artem Anisimov, Brandon Dubinsky, Tim Erixon and this pick.
 The Los Angeles Kings' first-round pick went to the Columbus Blue Jackets as a result of a February 23, 2012, trade that sent Jeff Carter to the Kings in exchange for Jack Johnson and this pick.
 The Columbus Blue Jackets' second-round pick went to the Pittsburgh Penguins as the result of a trade on June 30, 2013, that sent San Jose's second-round pick in 2013 (50th overall) and a third-round pick in 2013 (89th overall) to Columbus in exchange for this pick.
 The San Jose Sharks' second-round pick went to the Columbus Blue Jackets as the result of a trade on June 30, 2013, that sent a second-round pick in 2013 (44th overall) to Pittsburgh in exchange for a third-round pick in 2013 (89th overall) and this pick. Pittsburgh previously acquired this pick as the result of a trade on June 30, 2013, that sent Tyler Kennedy to San Jose in exchange for this pick.
 The Columbus Blue Jackets' third-round pick went to the New York Rangers as the result of a July 23, 2012, trade that sent Artem Anisimov, Brandon Dubinsky, Tim Erixon and a 2013 first-round pick to the Blue Jackets in exchange for Rick Nash, Steven Delisle and this pick.
 The Pittsburgh Penguins' third-round pick went to the Columbus Blue Jackets as the result of a trade on June 30, 2013, that sent a second-round pick in 2013 (44th overall) to Pittsburgh in exchange for San Jose's second-round pick in 2013 (50th overall) and this pick.
 The Columbus Blue Jackets' fifth-round pick went to the Calgary Flames as the result of an April 3, 2013, trade that sent Blake Comeau to the Blue Jackets in exchange for this pick.

Notes

References

Columbus Blue Jackets seasons
Columbus Blue Jackets season, 2013-14
Colum
Columbus Blue Jackets
Columbus Blue Jackets